Inga is a 1968 Swedish sexploitation film directed by Joseph W. Sarno. Three years later, Sarno also directed the sequel The Seduction of Inga.

Plot
After her mother dies, Inga is sent to live with her Machiavellian Aunt Greta, who attempts to set her up as the mistress of a wealthy older man in order to pay off debts.  The plan backfires when Karl, Greta's young lover, falls in love with Inga and runs away with her.

Cast
Marie Liljedahl as Inga Frilund
Monica Strömmerstedt as Greta Johansson, Inga's aunt
Thomas Ungewitter as Einar Nilsson, editor-in-chief
Anne-Lise Myhrvold as Dagmar
Casten Lassen as Karl Nistad, young writer
Else-Marie Brandt as Frida Dagheim, maid
Sissi Kaiser as Sigrid Nilsson, feature editor
Rose-Marie Nilsson
Curt Ericson as Hallstroem, boat salesman (as Kurt Eriksson)
Lennart Norbäck as Lothar Bjoerkson
Lotta Persson as Uta Dahlberg, judge
Anders Beling as Birger
Annabel Reis as Olga
Ulf Rönnquist as Tor
Kitty Kurkinen as Helga Lindqvist, young writer

Censorship 
The Italian Committee for the Theatrical Review of the Italian Ministry of Cultural Heritage and Activities did not approve the release of Inga in Italy. The reason for the denial, cited in the official documents, is: the immorality of its characters and the subject, and the numerous sexual scenes that they considered offensive to decency. Two years later, in 1971, the Movie Reviewing Commission, approved the projection of the movie, but rated it as VM18: not suitable for children under 18. In addition, the Committee imposed the removal of the following scenes: 1) the scene of the ritual of the Virgin (trial); 2) the scene in which Inga masturbates; 3) the scene in which Inga and the young man see each other for the third time and are in bed.

References

External links

1968 films
Films directed by Joseph W. Sarno
English-language Swedish films
Sexploitation films
Golan-Globus films
1960s English-language films
1960s Swedish films